Lauri Joona (born 7 December 1996) is a Finnish rally driver.

Career
Joona made Junior World Rally Championship debut at the 2020 Rally Sweden.

Results

WRC results

* Season still in progress.

References

External links
 Rally results profile

1996 births
Living people
Finnish rally drivers
World Rally Championship drivers
Place of birth missing (living people)
21st-century Finnish people